The 1925 Delaware Fightin' Blue Hens football team was an American football team that represented the University of Delaware as an independent during the 1925 college football season. in their first season under head coach Frank M. Forstburg, the Blue Hens compiled a 4–4 record and were outscored by a total of 71 to 63. The team played its home games at Frazier Field in Newark, Delaware.

Schedule

References

Delaware
Delaware Fightin' Blue Hens football seasons
Delaware Fightin' Blue Hens football